Louis Clyde Stoumen (July 15, 1917 – September 20, 1991), known as Lou Stoumen, was an American photographer, film director and producer. He won two Academy Awards; the first in 1957 for Best Documentary Short Subject (The True Story of the Civil War), and the second in 1963 for Best Documentary Feature (Black Fox: The Rise and Fall of Adolf Hitler).

Stoumen was born in Springtown, Bucks County, Pennsylvania, and died in Sebastopol, California. After graduating from Lehigh University in 1939, he worked as a freelance journalist and photographer in New York. Many of the photographs of Times Square he made were published in the 1985 book Times Square: 45 Years of Photographs.

Stoumen taught at UCLA Film School. He spoke of his innovation in The True Story of the Civil War. He invented a track for the camera to move back and forth over historic photos and paintings. It also tracked up and down (in and out). The technique is often referred to today as the "Ken Burns effect".

Stoumen received Colin Higgins' master's thesis, a screenplay called Harold and Maude. Stoumen spoke of his enjoyment of the writing, but doubted it would ever be produced. He wasn't unhappy when proven wrong by the film's success.

Stouman married Lini De Vries in 1943; the couple divorced in 1949.

The Academy Film Archive preserved The True Story of the Civil War and T Is for Tumbleweed by Stoumen.

Selected filmography
 The Naked Eye (1956)
 The True Story of the Civil War (1956)
 Operation Dames (1959)
 Black Fox: The Rise and Fall of Adolf Hitler (1962)

References

External links

Lou Stoumen, profile and photographs, Luminous-Lint
Works, J. Paul Getty Museum

1917 births
1991 deaths
Lehigh University alumni
20th-century American photographers
American film directors
American film producers
Directors of Best Documentary Feature Academy Award winners